Curtitoma trevelliana is a species of sea snail, a marine gastropod mollusk in the family Mangeliidae.

Description
The length of the shell varies between 6 mm and 12 mm.

The whitish shell is somewhat thin, ovately fusiform and subventricose. It contains six whorls, slightly planate above the carina. The aperture is nearly equally contracted above and below. The outer lip is a little insinuate below the shoulder. The surface is lightly decussated by inconspicuous longitudinal plications, evanescent below the middle of the body whorl, and close, fine revolving striae.

Distribution
This marine species occurs in the Bering Strait (Metchigme Bay), the Barents Sea, the Beaufort Sea, off Eastern Canada to Maine, USA, the North Atlantic Ocean (from Norway and Sweden to the British Isles), from the Arctic Ocean to California; in the Sea of Japan.

References

 Turton. Mag. N. H., vii, p. 351, 1834
 
 Brunel, P., L. Bosse, and G. Lamarche. 1998. Catalogue of the marine invertebrates of the estuary and Gulf of St. Lawrence. Canadian Special Publication of Fisheries and Aquatic Sciences, 126. 405 p.
 de Kluijver, M.J.; Ingalsuo, S.S.; de Bruyne, R.H. (2000). Macrobenthos of the North Sea [CD-ROM]: 1. Keys to Mollusca and Brachiopoda. World Biodiversity Database CD-ROM Series. Expert Center for Taxonomic Identification (ETI): Amsterdam, The Netherlands. .
 Gofas, S.; Le Renard, J.; Bouchet, P. (2001). Mollusca, in: Costello, M.J. et al. (Ed.) (2001). European register of marine species: a check-list of the marine species in Europe and a bibliography of guides to their identification. Collection Patrimoines Naturels, 50: pp. 180–213

External links
  A. Krause, Ein Beitrage zur Kenntniss der Mollusken-Fauna des Beeringsmeeres; Archiv für Naturgeschichte Jahrg. 51 Bd 1, 1885 
 Nekhaev, Ivan O. "Marine shell-bearing Gastropoda of Murman (Barents Sea): an annotated check-list." Ruthenica 24.2 (2014): 75
  Tucker, J.K. 2004 Catalog of recent and fossil turrids (Mollusca: Gastropoda). Zootaxa 682: 1–1295.
 
 Merkuljev A.V. (2015). The Bering Sea prosobranchiate gastropod species described by A. Krause in 1885 [in Russian]. Ruthenica. 25(4): 133–137

trevelliana
Taxa named by William Turton